Prasanna Sujit (also known as Prasanna Master) is an Indian dance choreographer who primarily works in South Indian cinemas. He has choreographed dance sequences for various south Indian films. He has won Kerala State Film Award for Best Choreography, three times.

Personal life
Prasanna was born for K Chandramohan and Hemalatha in Chennai, Tamil Nadu  He done his schoolings in Holy angels and Adarsh Senior secondary school in Tamil Nadu. He married Sudha Rao. Dance choreographers Kala Master and Brinda and Girija master are his nephews. He started his career in 1992 with his close relatives K.S.Raghuram, Kala Master and Brinda Master by assisting them for 7 years for becoming a choreographer.

Reality Shows

Awards and honours

References

Indian film choreographers
Living people
Indian choreographers
Choreographers
1976 births